Aisha Syed may refer to:

 Aisha Syed Castro, Dominican violinist
 Aisha Syed (politician), Pakistani politician